Jan de Doot is the subject of a painting by Carel van Savoyen.

Doot may also refer to:
 Doot (magazine), Gujarati Catholic monthly published from Gujarat, India
 Doot-Doot, a 1983 album by Freur
 "Doot-Doot" (song), a hit single from the album
 De zedighe doot van Carel den Vijfden, a historical play by Michiel de Swaen
 Doot Doot Garden, a mini-comics series by Craig Thompson
 "Doot Doot Pause Doot Doot", a song on the album Promotional Copy by Reggie and the Full Effect
 doot, means messenger in Sanskrit
 Meghdoot, ancient Indian epic by Kalidasa
 Operation Meghdoot, Indian military operation named after the epic